Tamás Aczél (16 December 1921 – 18 April 1994) was a Kossuth Prize-winning Hungarian poet, writer, journalist and university professor.

Career

Aczél was born in Budapest, Hungary in 1921. He graduated in his hometown in 1939, subsequently he went to Italy to study commerce and catering (1939–1941). After returned to Hungary, Aczél enrolled at the Pázmány Péter Catholic University and earned academic degree from Hungarian and English.

Initially, Aczél came out with poems; the first collection of these was published in 1941. Later, being favoured by the post-war Hungarian government, he wrote agitational poems and schematic novels, for them he was awarded the Kossuth Prize (1949) and the Stalin Prize (1952).

By 1953 Aczél radically broke with his earlier works; he gave up his an agitative poetry and became a leading figure of the literary opposition formed around Imre Nagy, that initiated the dismissal of the Stalinist-Rákosist literary control.

After the Hungarian Revolution of 1956 was repressed, Aczél fled the country and emigrated to England (1957–1966), before eventually settled in the United States (1966–1994). He became one of the best-known figures of the Hungarians emigrants and did a lot to make the story of the Hungarian Revolution more known. In the United States he was a professor at the University of Massachusetts Amherst until his death.

Personal life
Aczél met his wife, Olympic champion athlete Olga Gyarmati in emigration in England. Gyarmati was part of the 1956 Hungarian Olympic team of which many member decided to flee to the West following the unsuccessful revolution and the subsequent Soviet invasion of Hungary. They had two children, a son Tamás, and a daughter Júlia.

Works published in English
History of Intellectual Resistance behind Iron Curtain. Praeger Publication in Russian History and World Communism. (New York, 1959)
The Ice Age. A Novel. (New York, 1965)
Ten Years After. A Commemoration of the Tenth Anniversary of the Hungarian Revolution. (London, 1966)
Illuminations. Novel. (Pantheon Books. London, 1982)
The Hunt. Novel. (London, 1990)

References

1921 births
1994 deaths
Writers from Budapest
Hungarian male poets
Hungarian journalists
Hungarian emigrants to England
Hungarian emigrants to the United States
Stalin Prize winners
University of Massachusetts Amherst faculty
20th-century Hungarian poets
20th-century journalists